New York Police may refer to:

New York City Police Department (NYPD)
New York State Police (NYSP)
Port Authority Police Department (PAPD)